Saved is the 20th studio album by American singer-songwriter Bob Dylan, released on June 23, 1980, by Columbia Records. Saved was the second album of Dylan's "Christian trilogy". It expanded on themes explored on its predecessor Slow Train Coming, with gospel arrangements and lyrics extolling the importance of a strong personal faith.

Artwork
The cover of Saved originally featured a painting by Tony Wright of Jesus Christ's hand reaching down to touch the hands of his believers. However, this cover was subsequently replaced by a painting of Dylan on stage performing during that time period in order to downplay the overtly religious nature of the original cover. It has since been changed back on some re-releases. A quote inside the sleevenotes reads: "'Behold, the days come, sayeth the Lord, that I will make a new covenant with the house of Israel, and with the house of Judah' (Jeremiah 31:31)".

Release and reception

The album hit No. 3 on the UK charts, reached No. 24 on the US charts and did not go gold. CCM Magazine described the album as an "open declaration of Dylan's deepening faith." Critical reaction to the album was mixed. Robert Christgau awarded the album a "C+", which is described by Christgau as "most likely a failed experiment or a pleasant piece of hackwork". Writing for Rolling Stone, Kurt Loder praised Dylan's backing band, but felt that several songs were hampered by overtly religious messages, although he did single out "In the Garden" for having a "lovely, billowing arrangement". Loder stated that Dylan's efforts at a gospel album were not as remarkable as others "not just because he lacks the vocal equipment but because he's too inventive, too big for the genre", but summarised Saved as a gospel work with "some distinction". In 2020, Rolling Stone included Saved in their "80 Greatest albums of 1980" list, praising Dylan for being "at the peak of his vocal powers, and he’s rarely played with a better bunch of musicians".

Record World said of the single "Solid Rock" that "Dylan's latest inspiration is perhaps his greatest, as evidenced by this compelling rocker."

Track listing

Personnel
Bob Dylan – guitar, harmonica, keyboards, vocals
Carolyn Dennis – backing vocals
Tim Drummond – bass guitar
Regina Havis – backing vocals
Jim Keltner – drums
Clydie King – backing vocals
Spooner Oldham – keyboards
Fred Tackett – guitar
Monalisa Young – backing vocals
Terry Young – keyboards, backing vocals

Technical
Barry Beckett – production
Gregg Hamm – engineering
Bobby Hata – mastering
Mary Beth McLemore – assistant engineering
Arthur Rosato – photography
Jerry Wexler – production
Paul Wexler – mastering supervision
Tony Wright – artwork

Releases
Originally released in 1980 on LP and cassette, the album was first reprinted in 1985 and released on CD in 1990. Saved was remastered in 2013 for the release of The Complete Album Collection Vol. One.

References

External links
Official lyrics from BobDylan.com

1980 albums
Albums produced by Barry Beckett
Albums produced by Jerry Wexler
Bob Dylan albums
Columbia Records albums
Gospel albums by American artists